Kushnya (Quşna) is a rural locality (a village) in Kaleginsky Selsoviet, Kaltasinsky District, Bashkortostan, Russia. The population was 115 as of 2010. There are 2 streets.

Geography 
Kushnya is located 27 km northwest of Kaltasy (the district's administrative centre) by road. Koyanovo is the nearest rural locality.

References 

Rural localities in Kaltasinsky District